Tokibayama Toshio (born Toshio Haruki; May 5, 1944 - September 20, 1995) was a sumo wrestler from Nanao, Ishikawa, Japan. He made his professional debut in May 1961, and reached the top division in September 1967. Upon retirement from active competition he became an elder in the Japan Sumo Association under the name Fujigane. He died while an active oyakata.

Career record

See also
Glossary of sumo terms
List of past sumo wrestlers
List of sumo tournament second division champions

References

1944 births
Japanese sumo wrestlers
Sumo people from Ishikawa Prefecture
1995 deaths
People from Nanao, Ishikawa